Adolpho Wellisch (9 February 1886 – 19 October 1972) was a Brazilian diver. He competed in three events at the 1920 Summer Olympics.

References

External links
 

1886 births
1972 deaths
Brazilian male divers
Olympic divers of Brazil
Divers at the 1920 Summer Olympics
Divers from São Paulo
20th-century Brazilian people